Qarabörk (also, Qara-börk and Karabërk) is a village and municipality in the Ujar Rayon of Azerbaijan.  It has a population of 3,255.

References 

Populated places in Ujar District